This list is intended to be a full A-Z list of settlements and neighborhoods in the Caribbean island of Martinique:

Abandonne
Abondance
Absalon
Acajou
Adelaide Maillet
Adinet
Alma
Anse Figuiers
Anse Madame
Augrain
Bac
Balata
Balata-Tourtet
Bambous
Bareto
Barington
Barriere-la-Croix
Basse-Pointe
Baudelle
Beauchamp
Beauregard
Becouya
Bel-Air
Bel Event
Belfort
Bellay
Belle Ame
Belle Etoile (14°46'0"N 60°59'0"W)
Belle Etoile (14°29'0"N 60°50'0"W)
Bellefontaine
Belle Languette
Bellevue (14°'0"N 61°0'0"W)
Bellevue (14°28'0"N 60°56'0"W)
Bernard
Bezaudin
Birot
Bois Carré
Bois d'Inde
Bois du Parc
Bois la Charles
Bois Lezards
Bois Neuf (14°'0"N 60°57'0"W)
Bois Neuf (14°38'0"N 61°2'0"W)
Bois-Neuf (14°35'0"N 60°56'0"W)
Bois Neuf (14°28'0"N 60°50'0"W)
Bois Soldat
Bois Zombi
Bonneau
Bonneville
Bon Repos
Borel
Bossou
Boucan
Boutaud
Brevette
Brin d'Amour
Cadette
Cafe
Californie
Camee
Canton Suisse
Cap Cabaret
Cap Chevalier
Carabin
Caritan
Case Navire
Case-Pilote
Cedalise
Chambort
Champfleury
Champ Flore
Chapelle Villarson
Chateauboeuf
Château Gaillard
Chertine
Chevalier
Cite Dillon
Cite Petit Manoir
Clairiere
Cluny
Concorde
Concorde-Leyritz
Coridon
Corps de Garde
Croisée Decius
Croisée Manioc
Croisée Palmiste
Croisée Soldat
Croix Blanche
Croix Odilon
Daubert
Delivry
Demare
Derriere-Bois
Derriere Morne
Desert
Desforts
Desmarinieres
Desruisseaux
Deux Choux
Diaka
Dominant
Dominante
Duchène
Ducos
Duhamelin
Dumaine (14°42'0"N 61°'0"W)
Dumaine (14°35'0"N 60°5'0"W)
Duquesne
Eudorcait
Fantaisie
Faubourg Schoelcher
Ferme Saint-Jacques
Ferre
Fleury
Floréal
Fond Abattoir
Fond Bernier
Fond Boucher
Fond Bourlet
Fond Cacao
Fond Capot
Fond Collat
Fond Fleury
Fond-Gens-Libres (14°49'0"N 61°'0"W)
Fond Gens Libres (14°29'0"N 60°5'0"W)
Fond Giromond
Fond Grande Anse
Fond Hubert
Fond-Lahaye
Fond Marie-Reine
Fond Mascret
Fond Masson
Fond Moustiques
Fond Nicolas
Fond Nigaud
Fond Panier
Fond Repos
Fond Rose
Fond-Saint-Denis
Fond Saint-Jacques
Fonds Boheme
Fonds Brules
Fond-Zombi
Fontaine de Moutte
Fort-de-France
Four a Chaux (14°39'0"N 60°57'0"W)
Four a Chaux (14°36'0"N 61°0'0"W)
Gabourin
Gallochat
Garanne
Gerbault (14°'0"N 60°57'0"W)
Gerbault (14°36'0"N 61°'0"W)
Glotin
Gondeau
Gondeau-Saint-Joseph
Grand-Court
Grande Anse (14°42'0"N 61°'0"W)
Grande Anse (14°30'0"N 61°5'0"W)
Grande Savane
Grand' Riviere
Gros-Morne
Guenot
Guinée-Fleury
Hauteurs Bourdon
Hauteurs Dumas
Hauteurs Riviere Roche
Hyacinthe
Jean-Baptiste
Jeanne d'Arc
Josseaud
La Bateliere
La Batterie
La Baume
La Beleme
La Berry
La Boissiere
La Bonnie
La Californie
La Canelle
La Carrière
La Casse
La Cesaire
La Chapelle
La Chopotte
La Citerne
La Debuc
La Demarche
La Dessaint
La Duprey
La Durand
La Farelle
La Favorite
La Ferme Saint-Jacques
La Fontenay
La Fouquette
La Haut (14°38'0"N 60°57'0"W)
La-Haut (14°32'0"N 60°57'0"W)
La Huvet
L'Ajoupa-Bouillon
Lajus
La Manzo
La Massel
La Mauny
La Médaille
La Moise
La Monnerot
L'Anse Caffar
L'Anse Mitan
L'Anse Noire
La Pagerie
La Plaine
La Regale
La Renée
La Richard
La Salette
La Source
La Suffrin
La Suin
La Tocnay
La Tracée
La Tranchée
La Trinité
La Vatable
La Vierge (14°42'0"N 61°'0"W)
La Vierge (14°28'0"N 60°52'0"W)
Lazaret
Le Cap
Le Carbet
Le Centre
Le Coin
Le Diamant
Le François
Le Lamentin
Le Lorrain
Le Marin
Le Morne aux Boeufs
Le Morne des Olives
Le Morne Rouge
Le Morne-Vert
Le Mouillage
L'Enclos
Lepinay
Le Poteau
Le Prêcheur
L'Ermitage
L'Ermitage
Lero
Le Robert
Les Abymes
Le Saint-Esprit
Les Anses-d'Arlets
Les Boucaniers
Les Coteaux
Lescouet
Les Deux-Terres
Les Flamboyants
L'Esperance
Les Quatre Chemins
Lestrade
Les Trois-Ilets
Les Trois Ponts
Le Trou
Le Vauclin
Lheureux
Long-Bois (14°40'0"N 61°'0"W)
Long Bois (14°38'0"N 61°0'0"W)
Lourdes (14°'0"N 60°58'0"W)
Lourdes (14°29'0"N 60°5'0"W)
Lunette-Bouille
Macedoine
Macouba
Macre
Malevaut
Mare Capron
Mare Poirier
Marie Noire
Marigot
Maxime
Maximin
Mayol
Médecin
Mondesir (14°28'0"N 60°52'0"W)
Mondesir (14°26'0"N 60°52'0"W)
Mondesir-Pointe Sable
Monesie
Montgerald
Montjoly
Montravail
Morne Baguidi
Morne-Balai
Morne Baldara
Morne Bel
Morne Blanc
Morne Bois
Morne Capot
Morne Ceron
Morne Congo
Morne Courbaril (14°38'0"N 60°55'0"W)
Morne Courbaril (14°29'0"N 60°52'0"W)
Morne des Esses
Morne Flambeau
Morne Honore
Morne la Valeur
Morne Pavillon (14°45'0"N 60°55'0"W)
Morne Pavillon (14°37'0"N 60°57'0"W)
Morne-Pichevin
Morne Pitault
Morne Poirier (14°'0"N 60°59'0"W)
Morne Poirier (14°40'0"N 61°'0"W)
Morne Pois
Morne Rouge
Morne Serpent
Morne Sulpice
Morne Vallon
Morne Vent
Morne Vente
Morne-Vert (14°42'0"N 61°9'0"W)
Morne Vert (14°35'0"N 60°57'0"W)
Pain de Sucre
Palmiste
Parnasse
Pelletier
Perou
Petit Bourg
Petit Bresil
Petit Campèche
Petite Anse
Petite Lezarde
Petite Rivière
Petite Rivière Salee
Petite Savane
Petit Morne
Petit Paradis
Petit Sable
Petit Trou
Placide
Plaisable
Plateau-Didier
Plateforme
Pointe Athanase
Pointe Fort
Pointe Jean-Claude
Pointe la Mare
Pointe Larose
Poirer
Poirier (14°27'0"N 60°5'0"W)
Poirier (14°27'0"N 60°55'0"W)
Poiriers
Pomare
Pomponne
Pont de Chaînes
Poste Colon
Presqu'ile
Proprete
Propriete Poulet
Puyferrat
Quartier Abricot
Quartier Anse Azerot
Quartier Bac
Quartier Balata
Quartier Bas Ceron
Quartier Beaujolais
Quartier Beauregard
Quartier Beauvallon
Quartier Beco
Quartier Bedzy
Quartier Bellevue (14°36'0"N 61°6'0"W)
Quartier Bellevue (14°32'0"N 60°5'0"W)
Quartier Bocage
Quartier Bon Air
Quartier Bonnain
Quartier Boue
Quartier Chere Epice
Quartier Chevre
Quartier Cocoyer
Quartier Coulee d'Or
Quartier Courbaril (14°'0"N 61°2'0"W)
Quartier Courbaril (14°32'0"N 60°57'0"W)
Quartier Cyrille
Quartier Dabadie
Quartier de la T. S. F.
Quartier de l'Ex-voto
Quartier de l'Orangerie
Quartier Desbrosses
Quartier Deschamps
Quartier Descossieres
Quartier Desmartinieres
Quartier des Pitons
Quartier du Fort
Quartier du Morne Valentin
Quartier Firmin
Quartier Fond Guillet
Quartier Fond Mulatre
Quartier Fonds Zamy
Quartier Galette
Quartier Gillot
Quartier Glotin
Quartier Grand Bassin
Quartier Grosan
Quartier Humbert
Quartier la Beauville
Quartier la Dessaint
Quartier la Felix
Quartier la Fontaine
Quartier l'Allée
Quartier la Nau
Quartier la Sabine
Quartier Lecomte
Quartier Lelubois
Quartier Lowinsky
Quartier Lucon
Quartier Monplaisir
Quartier Monsieur
Quartier Morne Acajou
Quartier Morne a Roche
Quartier Morne Calebasse
Quartier Morne Carrette
Quartier Morne Covin
Quartier Morne Mignolle
Quartier Morne Piton
Quartier Morne Theodore
Quartier Palmene
Quartier Pays Mele
Quartier Perou
Quartier Petit Paradis
Quartier Piton
Quartier Pitons
Quartier Plateau Tiberge
Quartier Poix Doux Bocage
Quartier Prefontaine
Quartier Rabuchon
Quartier Ravine
Quartier Rivière Bambous
Quartier Rivière Monsieur (14°40'0"N 61°'0"W)
Quartier Rivière Monsieur (14°37'0"N 61°'0"W)
Quartier Rivière Pomme
Quartier Rivière Roche
Quartier Roches Carrées
Quartier Rollin
Quartier Sainte-Catherine
Quartiers Anse a l'Ane
Quartier Semaine
Quartier Vente
Quartier Vert-Pré
Rabat-Joie
Raisin
Rateau
Ravine Acajou
Ravine Braie
Ravine Touza
Ravine Vilaine
Reculée
Redoute
Regale
Regale-de-Saint-Esprit
Rivière
Rivière Cacao
Rivière Calecon
Rivière l'Or
Rivière-Pilote
Rivière-Salée
Rodon
Rousseau
Rue Paille
Saingaule
Saint-Aroman
Sainte-Anne
Sainte-Luce
Sainte-Marie
Sainte-Thérèse
Saint-Joseph
Saint-Maurice
Saint-Pierre (14°'0"N 61°10'0"W)
Saint-Pierre (14°35'0"N 60°56'0"W)
Saint-Roche
Saint-Vincent
Sans Pareil
Sarcelle
Sarraut
Savane Petit
Schœlcher
Serail
Sinai
Sucrerie
Tartane
Taupinière
Terres Sainville
Terreville
Tourtet
Touza
Trois-Rivières
Trou Grec
Trou Terre
Union
Valatte
Val d'Or
Verrier
Vert-Pré
Vieille Terre
Volga-Plage
Voltaire
Zabeth
Zobeide

 
Martinique
Populated Places